The following is a list of episodes for the anime show, Saint Tail. All original airdates are the dates of original airing in Japan.

References

Japanese language list of episodes
 
TV.com list of Saint Tail episodes

Lists of anime episodes
Episodes